is a former Japanese football player. She played for Japan national team. Her father Mamoru Morimoto is former middle distance runner.

Club career
Morimoto was born on 9 November 1970. She played for Nissan FC. However, the club was disbanded in 1993. After she left the club, she played for Nikko Securities Dream Ladies and the Ladies side of Italian Serie A club Lazio.

National team career
On 21 August 1994, Morimoto debuted and scored a goal for Japan national team against Austria. She was a member of Japan for 1995 World Cup. She also played at 1994 Asian Games and 1995 AFC Championship. She played 5 games and scored 1 goal for Japan until 1995.

National team statistics

See also 

 1995 FIFA Women's World Cup

References

External links
 

1970 births
Living people
Place of birth missing (living people)
Japanese women's footballers
Japan women's international footballers
Nadeshiko League players
Nissan FC Ladies players
Nikko Securities Dream Ladies players
1995 FIFA Women's World Cup players
Women's association football forwards
Asian Games medalists in football
Asian Games silver medalists for Japan
Footballers at the 1994 Asian Games
Medalists at the 1994 Asian Games